Foster Edwin "Charlie" Blackburn (January 6, 1895 – March 9, 1984) was a Major League Baseball pitcher who played for two seasons. He pitched for the Kansas City Packers for seven games during the 1915 Kansas City Packers season and one game for the Chicago White Sox during the 1921 Chicago White Sox season.

External links

1895 births
1984 deaths
Major League Baseball pitchers
Kansas City Packers players
Chicago White Sox players
St. Joseph Drummers players
Baseball players from Chicago